SS Peter and Paul is a Catholic church in Istanbul, important for historical reasons. The church owns an icon of the Virgin of the Hodegetria type, which originally lay in a Dominican church in Caffa, Crimea.  The current building is a nineteenth-century (1841 to 1843) reconstruction of the Fossati brothers. An adjacent former commercial facility, Saint Pierre Han, is (as of 2022) set to be renovated into a cultural center.

Location

The church lies in Karaköy (ancient Galata) neighborhood of the district of Beyoğlu, Istanbul, Turkey. Its address is Galata Kulesi Sokak 44, Kuledibi.

History
After that in 1475 Sultan Mehmet II had converted the Dominican Church of San Paolo in Galata into a mosque, in 1476 the friars moved two hundred meters East, always below the Galata Tower, in a house with land owned by Venetian noblemen Angelo Zaccaria. In the building was enclosed a small chapel - used by nuns - dedicated to the Saints Peter and Paul. On 20 April 1535, the old Zaccaria ceded the house to the Dominicans against the monthly offer of a candle and the weekly celebration of a mass for the souls of himself and his parents. In 1603-1604 the chapel was rebuilt as a larger church together with a monastery. In 1608, a Firman of Sultan Ahmed III  put the complex under the protection of the King of France, while at the same time the church got also a yearly subsidy from the Republic of Venice. 

In 1640, a large icon of the Hodegetria type (originally in Caffa) which belonged to the Dominican Church of S. Maria di Costantinopoli, located inside the walled city of Istanbul and in that year converted into a mosque, was moved here. In 1660 the church and the monastery burned and, since the destruction had been total (except for the icon which could be rescued), according to the law the ground was returned to the Ottoman Government. Despite that, thanks to the intercession of the European Powers, a new church could be built again in 1702. Since 1706, after the Dominicans refused to deliver the Hodegetria Icon to Venice, the Republic quit paying the subsidy to the church. Around those years, the Icon was partially repainted (the mantle of the Virgin appears now embroidered with the Fleurs-de-lis of France), so that only her face and chest are possibly original. The complex burned again during the great fire of Galata in 1731, and was rebuilt with wood. From 1841 to 1843 the Swiss-Italian brothers Gaspare and Giuseppe Fossati erected the present building. 

Together with Saint Anthony and Saint Mary Draperis, SS. Peter and Paul was one of the three Levantine parishes in Beyoğlu. The parish jurisdiction extended over the lower part of the Galata neighborhood, a popular area which often became the first residence for European immigrants settling in the city. Due to that, the parish's birth, wedding and death registers represent an invaluable source for the history of the recurring waves of immigration in the 18th and 19th century. The church now serves the local Maltese community, with masses in Italian.

Architecture
The church is built in the form of a basilica, with a four side altar. The cupola over the choir is sky blue, studded with gold stars. The church's rear wall is built into a section of Galata's old Genoese ramparts.  The church possesses several relics: those of Saint Renatus (found in the catacombs of Galata), and others of Saint Thomas, Saint Dominic and the Saints Peter and Paul. The yard East of the church's entrance takes the form of a narrow alleyway enclosed by high walls which are covered with sculptures and inscribed gravestones, most of them in Italian. More graves are contained in the church's crypt.

Saint-Pierre Han

The  is a warehouse and trading venue (or caravanserai) that was a commercial dependency of the church erected on its grounds. It was built as a wooden structure in 1732, burned in 1770, and was reconstructed with more durable materials in 1771-1772 on the initiative of French ambassador François-Emmanuel Guignard de Saint-Priest. It housed a number of organizations and enterprises, including the Constantinople Bar Association, the Italian Chamber of Commerce, the Ottoman Bank on its upper floor between 1856 and 1893, a mustard producer, and a denim workshop under the  brand, . 

In the late 19th and early 20th centuries, Saint Pierre Han was a favorite venue for architecture firms, including those of Alexander Vallaury (1850-1921), Hovsep Aznavur (1854-1935),  (1873-1951), as well as Alexandre Neocosmos (also known as Yenidünya), the interior designer of the ornate  building in Istanbul. While working there, Vallaury had a plaque apposed on the building to commemorate the birth on that site of André Chénier in 1762.

In 2011, the Bahçeşehir Uğur Education Foundation, sponsor of Bahçeşehir University, started renting the property with plans to install a conservatory. It later developed plans to renovate it jointly with Istanbul Municipality, and repurpose it as a cultural center.

References

Sources

External links
 Sen Piyer Kilisesi (official website) 
 Saint Pierre ve Saint Paul Kilisesi (İstanbul) 
 Church of SS Peter and Paul

Roman Catholic churches in Istanbul
Roman Catholic churches completed in 1843
19th-century Roman Catholic church buildings in Turkey
Buildings and structures in Beyoğlu
1843 establishments in the Ottoman Empire